The LA84 Foundation/John C. Argue Swim Stadium (originally the Los Angeles Swimming Stadium) is an aquatics center that was originally constructed for the 1932 Summer Olympics in Los Angeles, California. Located near the Los Angeles Memorial Coliseum, the venue hosted the diving, swimming, water polo, and the swimming part of the modern pentathlon events.

The venue seated 10,000, including 5,000 in wooden bleacher seats that were removed after the 1932 games. A children's pool is adjacent to the main pool.

The facility was featured by Huell Howser in California's Gold Episode 702.

The venue was renovated in 2002-03. Bentley Management Group was hired in 2006 to refurbish and install the Olympic Rings on the south side of the Swim Stadium. The Rings were used in the 1984 Summer Olympics and were lit by Rafer Johnson during the Opening Ceremony at the LA Coliseum.

The Swim Stadium was later renamed in honor of the LA84 Foundation and for John C. Argue (1931 or 1932 - 2002), a Los Angeles-based lawyer who served as a key board member player for bringing the Olympics back to LA 52 years later. Argue also served as chair of the board of trustees for the University of Southern California from 2000 until his death in 2002, and was part of the unsuccessful effort to bring the 2016 Summer Olympics to LA.

References

1932 Summer Olympics official report. pp. 68, 79, 83.
John C. Argue Swim Stadium profile on LA Parks.org.
LA Parks.org site on the aquatics center at the EXPO.
University of Southern California August 12, 2002 article on John C. Argue.
Swim LA, John C. Argue Swim Stadium

Venues of the 1932 Summer Olympics
Exposition Park (Los Angeles)
Olympic diving venues
Olympic modern pentathlon venues
Olympic swimming venues
Olympic water polo venues
Swimming venues in Los Angeles